USS G-2 (SS-27) was a G-class submarine of the United States Navy. While the four G-boats were nominally all of a class, they differed enough in significant details that they are sometimes considered to be four unique boats, each in a class by herself. G-2 was named Tuna when her keel was laid down on 20 October 1909 by the Lake Torpedo Boat Company in Bridgeport, Connecticut, making her the first ship of the United States Navy to be named for the tuna, a large, vigorous, spiny-finned fish highly esteemed for sport and food. She was renamed G-2 on 17 November 1911, launched on 10 January 1912 sponsored by Ms. Marjorie F. Miller, towed to the New York Navy Yard after the termination of the Lake contract on 7 November 1913 where she was completed, and commissioned on 1 December 1913.

Service history
Departing New York City under tow of submarine tender Ozark (ex-Arkansas) the submersible torpedo boat arrived at the torpedo station, Newport, Rhode Island, on 28 February 1914. Her engines proved troublesome, however, and after the port armature shaft failed on 31 March, the boat was towed to New York for repairs. While there, financial considerations led to G-2 being put in reserve commission on 15 June 1914.

G-2 was placed in full commission at New York City on 6 February 1915. Attached to Division Three, Submarine Flotilla, Atlantic Fleet, the boat joined G-1, tender  and tug , for a cruise to Norfolk, Virginia on 25 March. Arriving there two days later, the submersible conducted maneuvers in Hampton Roads before proceeding to Charleston, South Carolina in April, arriving there on 17 April. Following a short yard period for repairs, the division proceeded back to New York, mooring alongside the 135th Street pier on 9 May.

On 18 May, G-2 joined other warships and passed in review before President of the United States Woodrow Wilson, who looked on from the yacht . The boat then sailed to Nantucket, Massachusetts, to participate in a war problem off Block Island, before unloading her torpedoes at Newport on 25 May. Ordered back to New York for an overhaul, the submersible again transited the familiar waters of Long Island Sound before arriving at the mouth of the East River on 22 June. Fortunately, none of the boats suffered any damage. G-2 entered the Navy Yard there for an extended overhaul later that day.

Escorted to Provincetown, Massachusetts, by Ozark and tug , G-2 commenced final acceptance trials from 1–10 December. Following those successful evolutions, during which the Trial Board noted numerous items requiring modernization, the boat moved back to New York for an overhaul on 14 January 1916. Six months later, G-2 shifted to the Lake Torpedo Boat Company yard for completion, receiving new diving rudder gear, hydroplanes, electrical wiring and a new crankshaft.

On 21 August, G-2 sailed to Boston, Massachusetts via the Cape Cod Canal to operate with the destroyer , submarine chaser SC-6, and steam yacht . There, the boat helped a Navy Experimental Board embarked in Margaret carry out various sound detector tests in nearby waters. The submarine also conducted practice approaches and served as an instruction platform for officer and enlisted submarine students.

Shifting back to New London on 20 October, G-2 combined work on sound detection devices with training for the newly established Submarine School off Block Island and in Long Island Sound. During seven months of operations, she experimented with magnetic detectors and dragging devices and tried out new periscopes and other submarine equipment. Learning of the possible proximity of German U-boats, she conducted four-day patrols off Block Island in late June 1918 and again in mid-July.

G-2 continued schoolship duty out of New London through the end of World War I, testing listening and flare signaling devices (including the Very System Signal) among other pieces of equipment. On 30 August, for example, her crew tested the strength of the pressure hull, and the reliability of electric equipment, against depth charge explosions. This duty ended in January 1919 when she was scheduled for inactivation.

Decommissioned on 2 April, the boat was designated as a target for testing depth charges and ordnance nets in Niantic Bay, Connecticut. During inspection by a six-man maintenance crew on 30 July, the boat suddenly flooded and sank at her moorings in Two Tree Channel near Niantic Bay. Too deep and too old to salvage, the submarine was struck from the Naval Vessel Register on 11 September.

References

External links
 
 On Eternal Patrol: USS G-2

United States G-class submarines
World War I submarines of the United States
Shipwrecks of the Connecticut coast
Ships built in Bridgeport, Connecticut
1912 ships
Maritime incidents in 1919